Jill Boon (born 13 March 1987) is a Belgian field hockey player. At the 2012 Summer Olympics she competed with the Belgium women's national field hockey team in the women's tournament.

Her brother is Tom Boon, also a field hockey player for Belgium.

References

External links 
 
 

Living people
1987 births
Field hockey players at the 2012 Summer Olympics
Olympic field hockey players of Belgium
Belgian female field hockey players
People from Uccle
Female field hockey forwards
Field hockey players from Brussels